Ahmet Oğuz Çetin (born 15 February 1963) is a Turkish football manager and former football player.

Career
Born in Adapazarı, Çetin began playing football with the local side Sakaryaspor. He started to play regularly for Fenerbahçe in 1988. He became one of the franchise players for Fenerbahçe and Turkish football generally. He is well known for his superior ability to organize the midfield and also had a decent vision, passing and shooting skills. He is known as "emperor" by Turkish soccer fans. Mostly walking on the pitch, Oguz Cetin was more of a distributor. Best known for his milimetric passes, he led Fenerbahçe to the championship in 1995–96 season but Fenerbahçe chairman Ali Haydar Şen released Oğuz Çetin and his fellow striker Aykut Kocaman with the thought they have been destroying the harmony in the team. Çetin played for Istanbulspor and Adanaspor after he was released by Fenerbahçe in 1996.

He was capped 70 times for the Turkey national football team. He represented his country at the 1996 UEFA European Championship in England.

After his playing career ended, Çetin became assistant manager for Fenerbahçe in 2002. After Werner Lorant's dismissal, he worked as a manager for Fenerbahçe. However, he failed to manage the team well. He also worked as a manager for Gençlerbirliği and Diyarbakırspor.

He signed a one-year contract with Azerbaijani football team Khazar Lankaran in June 2014, resigning in the December of the same year.

References

External links
 
 
 
 
 

1963 births
Living people
Sportspeople from Adapazarı
Association football midfielders
Turkish football managers
Turkish footballers
Turkey international footballers
Turkey youth international footballers
Sakaryaspor footballers
Fenerbahçe S.K. footballers
İstanbulspor footballers
Adanaspor footballers
Fenerbahçe football managers
UEFA Euro 1996 players
Süper Lig players
Turkish people of Circassian descent
Süper Lig managers
Khazar Lankaran FK managers
Turkish expatriate football managers